The men's sanda 70 kilograms competition at the 2018 Asian Games in Jakarta, Indonesia was held from 19 August to 23 August at the JIExpo Kemayoran Hall B3.

A total of fifteen competitors from fifteen countries (NOCs) competed in this event, limited to fighters whose body weight was less than 70 kilograms.

Mohsen Mohammadseifi from Iran won the gold medal after beating his opponent Shi Zhanwei of China in gold medal bout 2–0, Mohammadseifi won both rounds by the same score of 5–0 to win his third Asian Games title. Mohammadseifi won the gold medal without losing a single round in the entire competition.

The bronze medal was shared by both semifinal losers, Puja Riyaya from the host nation Indonesia and Ham Gwan-sik from South Korea.

Schedule
All times are Western Indonesia Time (UTC+07:00)

Results
Legend
TV — Technical victory

References

External links
Official website

Men's sanda 70 kg